Countess of Carnarvon is a title given to the wife of the Earl of Carnarvon. Women who have held the title include:

Elizabeth Herbert, Countess of Carnarvon (1752–1826)
Kitty Herbert, Countess of Carnarvon (1772–1813)
Almina Herbert, Countess of Carnarvon (1876–1969)
Tilly Losch (1903–1975)